Distancia may refer to:

Film and TV
Distancias (film), 2008 Spanish documentary film
, 2006 film with Miguel Ángel Silvestre

Music

Albums
Distancia (José José album)
Distancia (Magos Herrera album)
La Distancia (EP), by Deny
Distancias (album) by Puerto Rican folk singer Roy Brown 1977

Songs
"Distância", Brazilian bolero sung by Dalva de Oliveira, composed by Marino Pinto (1916–1965)
"", hit song by Roberto Carlos List of number-one singles of 1974
"A Distância", Brazilian version of the Spanish song also sung by Roberto Carlos
"", hit song by Yolandita Sueños
"Distancia", Spanish song from Distancia
"La Distancia", song by Deny from Por Siempre

Other
La distancia, poem by Rubén Martínez